Events from the year 1784 in art.

Events
 July 30 – Adolf Ulrik Wertmüller is elected to the Académie royale de peinture et de sculpture in Paris.
 date unknown – Thomas Chippendale, the younger, begins exhibiting his paintings at the Royal Academy.

Works

 John Bacon – seated sculpture of Sir William Blackstone (Codrington Library, All Souls College, Oxford, England)
 James Barry – The Progress of Human Culture (completed series in Great Room of Society for the Encouragement of Arts, Manufactures and Commerce in London)
 Antonio Carnicero – Ascent of Monsieur Bouclé's Montgolfier Balloon in the Gardens of Aranjuez
 Jacques-Louis David – Oath of the Horatii (Musée du Louvre, Paris)
 Thomas Gainsborough
 John Hobart, 2nd Earl of Buckinghamshire and his wife Caroline Connolly
 Frances Browne, Mrs John Douglas
 Louise Élisabeth Vigée Le Brun – Two portraits of the Comte de Vaudreuil
 Charles Willson Peale
 General Benjamin Lincoln
 Washington, Lafayette & Tilghman at Yorktown (the "Annapolis portrait")
 George Romney – Sir William Hamilton
 Gilbert Stuart – Portrait of Sir Joshua Reynolds
 John Webber – Death of Cook
 Johann Zoffany – Portrait of Claud Alexander with his brother Boyd, attended by an Indian servant

Awards

Births
 January 21 – Peter De Wint, English landscape painter (died 1849)
 February 29 – Leo von Klenze, German neoclassicist architect, painter and writer (died 1864)
 May 4 – Rubens Peale, American artist and museum director (died 1865)
 June 4 – François Rude, French sculptor (died 1855)
 July 11 – Paul Joseph Gabriël, Dutch painter and sculptor (died 1833)
 September 23 – Peter von Cornelius, German painter (died 1867)
 October – Sarah Biffen, disabled English painter (died 1850)
 November 3 – Antonín Mánes, Czech painter (died 1843)
 November 21 – Gustaf Wilhelm Finnberg, Finnish painter (died 1833)
 November 28 – Claude Victor de Boissieu, French artist and local politician (died 1868)
 December 26 – Antoni Brodowski, Polish Neo-classicist painter and pedagogue (died 1832)
 date unknown
 John Cox Dillman Engleheart, English miniature painter (died 1862)
 William Essex, English enamel-painter (died 1869)
 Charles Gough, English landscape artist (died 1805)
 Ernestine Panckoucke, French botanical illustrator and flower painter (died 1860)
 Stepan Pimenov, Russian sculptor (died 1833)
 Jacopo Tumicelli, Italian portrait miniature painter (died 1825)

Deaths
 January 17 – Yosa Buson, Japanese poet and painter (born 1716)
 May 29 – George Barret, Sr., Irish landscape artist best known for his portraits of the British countryside (born 1730)
 July 15 – Johann Baptist Straub, German Rococo sculptor (born 1704)
 August 10 – Allan Ramsay, Scottish portrait-painter (born 1713)
 August 14 – Nathaniel Hone, British portrait painter (born 1718)
 September 7 – Andrea Casali – Italian painter of the Rococo period (born 1705)
 September 15 – Nicolas Bernard Lépicié, French painter (born 1735)
 October 29 – Giuseppe Zais, Italian painter of landscapes (vedutisti) (born 1709)
 date unknown
 Antonio Beltrami, Italian painter (born 1724)
 Giuseppe Bottani, Italian painter (born 1717)
 Simon Fokke, Dutch designer, etcher and engraver (born 1712)
 John Foldsone, English portrait painter (born unknown)
 Stefano Torelli, Italian painter of altar-pieces and ceiling decorations (born 1712)

References

 
Years of the 18th century in art
1780s in art